Emil Frey Racing is a Swiss racing team and racecar constructor. The team is named after the Emil Frey Gruppe, a Swiss car dealership for Jaguar, Lexus and other marques. Emil Frey Racing was founded in 2011, competing in the Blancpain GT Series and other series.

History
In 2011, the family business Emil Frey AG took the decision to set up its own division within the headquarters at Safenwil (AG) to be engaged once again in Motorsport, starting from 2012.

Motorsport has always been highly ranked in the company. There is no other place where technical competence can be as efficiently demonstrated as within a sportive competition. It is an excellent stage for image building for an international brand and an important platform to test developments, which will ultimately make road cars safer, more comfortable and of higher quality.

With Lorenz Frey heading the division as Team Principal and being joined by engaged engineers and employees, Emil Frey Racing was started in its third generation. It is a re-launch of an unforgotten team, which managed to celebrate many highlights in the 30s, 70s and 80s. Company founder Emil Frey tested his motorcycles within the racing world, Walter Frey continued to do so with his MINI Cooper and Toyota. Son Lorenz Frey brings the Emil Frey GT3 Jaguar and the Lexus RC F GT3 back on the race track. For 2019, the team is cooperating with Lamborghini Squadra Corse.

Jaguar XK Emil Frey G3

The team started development of the Jaguar racing car in 2011. While Lorenz Frey and Fredy Barth built the racing team, the car was built by Bemani Motorenbau AG. In spring 2012 the car ran for the first time at the Anneau du Rhin circuit. The Swiss team launched a Jaguar XKR based racecar built to GT3 specifications in 2012. However, as GT3 regulations allow little in season development the car was homologated into the RACB G3 class. The development was headed by Emil Frey's grandson, Lorenz and Fredy Barth. Experienced GT racer Gabriele Gardel joined the team during the races and Rolf Maritz joined the outfit for the 2012 24 Hours of Spa.

The first race of the Jaguar was run at Circuit Paul Ricard where Frey, Barth and Gardel finished 31st. Drive train problems in the 24 Hours of Spa caused early end to another test race. More technical problems haunted the team at the season finale at Circuito de Navarra.

As the Jaguar was not ready for the season opener of the 2013 Blancpain Endurance Series the team opted to race an Aston Martin V12 Vantage. Emil Frey Racing entered the Aston Martin in the 2013 24 Hours of Spa. During qualifying Barth suffered a puncture at the very fast Raidillon corner. The car suffered heavy damage and did not start the race. The Jaguar returned for the Nürburgring round of the championship. The race ended early after a crash damaged the steering box.

For 2014 the Jaguar was fitted with a new Ilmor 5.0L V8 engine to compete the full 2014 Blancpain Endurance Series. Lorenz Frey, Gardel and Barth competed the majority of the season. Jonathan Hirschi joined the team as of Spa. Frey placed second in the opening test session of the season opener at Monza. However, a small fire in the car damaged the car resulting in the team having to abandon the race. After a mechanical retirement at Silverstone, the team finished 32nd at Paul Ricard. In the 2014 24 Hours of Spa the team suffered multiple gearbox and suspension issues causing the retirement. Hirsche replaced Frey for the season finale at the Nürburgring moving the team into the Pro class. At the German track the team finished nineteenth overall, tenth in class.

Former Sauber operations director Jürg Flach joined the team as the technical and operations director as of 2015. Frey, Barth and Gardel returned as the driver trio in the 2015 Blancpain Endurance Series. In the season opening 3-hours of Monza the team retired with engine problems. The team returned at Silverstone with an 18th overall finish, third in the Pro-Am Cup. The team had no technical issues during the season finishing every race, including a 27th place at the 24 Hours of Spa. The team won the Pro-Am Cup at the Nürburgring season finale.

For 2016 the team announced a new line-up with Albert Costa and Stéphane Ortelli joining Lorenz Frey. The trio finished every race until the season finale but failed to score points. Their best result was a 20th place at the first race of the season at Monza. The team entered a second car as of the 24 Hours of Spa. Hirschi returned to the team with Christian Klien and Markus Palttala for the 24 Hour race. Norbert Siedler replaced Palttala at the Nürburgring. The team placed seventh at the Nürburging scoring six championship points.

The team entered two Jaguars for the 2017 Blancpain GT Series Endurance Cup. Marco Seefried joined the Klien and Hirschi Jaguar while Costa, Ortelli en Frey raced the other car. Costa and Frey were replaced by Siedler and Alex Fontana before the season finale. Ortelli, Costa and Frey scored the team's best result. At Silverstone the team finished tenth overall scoring the team's single championship point.

Lexus factory team

Initial development and VLN

Emil Frey Racing was selected, along with Farnbacher Racing to develop the Lexus RC F GT3. The car was not built by Emil Frey Racing but by Toyota's Japanese motorsports arm Toyota Technocraft. The car made its competition debut in 2015. The Lexus won their class at the 46. Adenauer ADAC Worldpeace Trophy, part of the VLN championship. Farnbacher Racing (with Dominik and Mario Farnbacher) won the class, while Emil Frey Racing finished second in class with Lorenz Frey, Jordan Tresson and Markus Oestreich. The trio again finished second in class in the Opel 6h ADAC Ruhr-Pokal-Rennen, this time behind Scuderia Cameron Glickenhaus. As the Lexus was absent in the yearly FIA Balance of Performance test for Group GT3 cars, the car was not homologated for the 2016 season. As a non-homologated car the Lexus continued in the SPX class of the VLN championship. Lorenz Frey and Stéphane Ortelli started the season at the 41. DMV 4 Hour Race. In qualifying Frey had an accident on the Kesselchen section of the 25 km Nürburgring Nordschleife. Frey was uninjured but the Lexus had to abandon the race. The season's best result was at the 56. ADAC Reinoldus-Langstreckenrennen where Frey and Ortelli finished tenth overall, second in class.

International GT Open
After receiving Group GT3 homologation (number GT3-046), the team entered the International GT Open in 2017. Albert Costa and Philipp Frommenwiler raced the racing series based in Spain. The duo won the first race of the season at Estoril. The duo again won at Spa-Francorchamps. At the Hungaroring the team suffered their first retirement after a collision with the #51 Teo Martín Motorsport BMW M6. The team won two more races, at Silvertone and Barcelona to finish third in the team standings.

Blancpain GT Series:

In 2018, until the finale race the Swiss led the Endurance Cup and secured second place with only six points missing to win the Cup. Additionally, Emil Frey Racing secured its best-ever team result with third place in the overall Team Championship.

Race results

Blancpain Endurance Series

(key) (Races in bold indicate pole position) (Races in italics indicate fastest lap)

Veranstaltergemeinschaft Langstreckenpokal Nürburgring

International GT Open

References

Swiss racecar constructors
Swiss auto racing teams
Blancpain Endurance Series teams
International GT Open teams
ADAC GT Masters teams
Jaguar in motorsport
Auto racing teams established in 2011
Deutsche Tourenwagen Masters teams